Centre for Social Justice (CSJ)  is an NGO with its secretariat based in Lahore, Pakistan that engages in result-oriented research, evidence-based public policy advocacy and capacity building concerning human rights, democratic development and social justice for the marginalized groups in Pakistan in particular. It engages actively in policy dialogue with government departments/ ministries, educational institutions, national human rights institutions and civil society at large.

Leadership 
Peter Jacob, known as human rights defender, trainer, and columnist, is serving as the Exclusive Director of the Centre for Social Justice.

Working Group for Inclusive Education 
Centre for Social Justice (CSJ) facilitates functions and coordination among the Working Group for Inclusive Education that is composed of eminent educationists, researchers and policy experts from Pakistan. It engages in research based analysis, monitoring policy-making processes and evidence based advocacy for reforms in education sector particularly relating to curriculum, education policy and textbooks, and developing perspectives through discussions, dialogue with policy makers and influencers, to draw attention to facilitate inclusive, equitable and quality learning.

Peoples Commission for Minorities' Rights 
Centre for Social Justice (CSJ) facilitates functions and coordination for Peoples’ Commission for Minorities’ Rights (PCMR) that is composed of individuals from academia, journalism, legal practice having proficiency in the rights based work and individual credibility from various regions of the country. PCMR engages in awareness raising and advocacy for legislation on matters that affect religious minorities, and issuing press statements on violations of human rights as well as speak on the policy issues.

Publications 
Centre for Social Justice has produced numerous research studies on specific themes relating to human rights.

 White Paper on Confusing Demographics of Minorities, an assessment of the data from population census in Pakistan. 
 Human Rights Observer, a factsheet on the rights of religious minorities in Pakistan, covering cases of blasphemy laws, forced conversions, and standpoint on educational reforms and population census. 
 Quality Education Vs Fanatic Literacy, a study based on the analysis of policies and textbooks content.
 Challenges in Exercising Religious Freedom in Pakistan
 Silence of the Lamb, a study on forced conversions in Pakistan.
 Lessons from nationalization of education in 1972, a study assessing the impact of education policy, 1972 on the education and minorities.
 Implementation of Job Quota for Religious Minorities in Pakistan, a study assessing the implementation of job quota policy in Pakistan.        
 Justice Yet Afar, A Long Wait for Justice, a compliance assessment of the Supreme Court’s Verdict (SMC No. 1/2014) regarding minorities rights, given by then Chief Justice Tassaduq Hussain Jillani on 19 June 2014.
 Defining National Interest in Human Development, a research study assessing the economic, developmental and relational impact of policy for regulation of INGOs in Pakistan and the markers of national interest in the social sector.

References

Ethnic groups in Pakistan
Human rights in Pakistan
Human rights organizations
Organisations based in Lahore
Organizations established in 2014
Religion in Pakistan